Juan Francisco Aguinaga Garzón (born 4 January 1978) is an Ecuadorian football midfielder.

International career
He was a member of the Ecuador national football team at the 2001 Copa América.

References

External links

1978 births
Living people
Footballers from Quito
Ecuadorian footballers
Ecuador international footballers
2001 Copa América players
C.D. ESPOLI footballers
C.D. Cuenca footballers
Barcelona S.C. footballers
C.D. El Nacional footballers
S.D. Aucas footballers
C.D. Universidad Católica del Ecuador footballers
Association football midfielders